The interleukin 11 receptor is a type I cytokine receptor, binding interleukin 11. It is a heterodimer composed of an interleukin 11 receptor alpha subunit and an incompletely characterized beta subunit.

References

External links
 

Type I cytokine receptors